Chris Stokes may refer to:

Chris Stokes (footballer) (born 1991), English footballer
Chris Stokes (bobsledder) (born 1963), Jamaican bobsledder
Chris Stokes (director) (born 1969), American record producer, manager, and film director